Joan Reed (born ) is an English curler and curling coach.

At the national level, she is a ten-time English women's champion (1988, 1990, 1991, 1994, 1997, 1998, 2000, 2005, 2006, 2007) and 2005 English mixed champion curler.

Teams

Women's curling

Mixed curling

Record as a coach of national teams

References

External links 

Living people
1952 births
English female curlers
English curling champions
English curling coaches
Place of birth missing (living people)